Sognamål (literally "Sogn language", in Sognamål) is a Western Norwegian dialect which is spoken in the area of Sogn. The folk/black metal band Windir from Sogndal used the dialect in their lyrics.

Phonology

Consonants 

  are bilabial, whereas  are labiodental.
  are plosives, whereas  are affricates.
 Phonetically,  can be trilled  or tapped .

Vowels 

  is close-mid front . Its short counterpart is the open-mid front .
  are close-mid .
 The long  is open-mid front , whereas the short  varies between open-mid front  and near-close front .
  are open-mid .
  are central .

  are phonetically .
  are phonetically .
  are phonetically .
  are phonetically .
  are phonetically .
  are phonetically .
  are phonetically .
  are phonetically .

References

Bibliography

 

Norwegian dialects
Culture in Sogn og Fjordane